St James Church, Anston is a grade I listed Church of England parish church situated in Anston, South Yorkshire, England.

History
Anston has had a parish church on this site for centuries, the earliest mention dating back to the 12th century.

See also
Grade I listed buildings in South Yorkshire
Listed buildings in Anston

References

12th-century church buildings in England
Church of England church buildings in South Yorkshire
Grade I listed churches in South Yorkshire